Auguste Baptiste Cavadini (born 21 July 1865 in Morbio Inferiore, Switzerland, date of death unknown) was a French sport shooter who competed in the late 19th century and early 20th century. He participated in Shooting at the 1900 Summer Olympics in Paris and won a bronze medal with the military rifle team.

References

External links
 

French male sport shooters
Olympic bronze medalists for France
Olympic shooters of France
Shooters at the 1900 Summer Olympics
1865 births
Year of death missing
Place of birth missing
Olympic medalists in shooting
Medalists at the 1900 Summer Olympics
People from Mendrisio
Sportspeople from Ticino